The Most Distinguished Order of Loyalty to the Royal Family of Malaysia is a Malaysian federal award presented for service and loyalty to the Crown, often to members of the armed forces, police and civil service.

Order ranks

Commander

The highest class of the order is the Commander of the Order of Loyalty to the Royal Family of Malaysia (P.S.D.).

The award recipient receives the title Datuk and his wife Datin. 

There is no limit to the number of persons to be awarded this honour. It can also be conferred on foreign citizens as an honorary award. It does not carry any title.

Companion

Companion of the Order of Loyalty to the Royal Family of Malaysia (J.S.D.) is the second class of this order.

There is no limit to the number of persons to be awarded this honour. It can also be conferred on foreign citizens as an honorary award. It does not carry any title.

Officer

Officer of the Order of Loyalty to the Royal Family of Malaysia (K.S.D.) is the third class of this order.

There is no limit to the number of persons to be awarded this honour. It can also be conferred on foreign citizens as an honorary award. It does not carry any title.

Herald

Herald of the Order of Loyalty to the Royal Family of Malaysia (B.S.D.) is the lowest class of this order.

There is no limit to the number of persons to be awarded this honour. It can also be conferred on foreign citizens as an honorary award. It does not carry any title.

Recipients

Commanders (P.S.D.)
The Commanders receives the title Datuk and his wife Datin.

 1965: Chellapah Sinnadurai
 1965: Jaafar bin Mampak
 1965:	Nik Mustapha Fathil bin Haji Nik Mahmood
 1966: R.P. Pillai
 1968:	Abu Bakar bin Ibrahim
 1968:	Tuan Haji Mohamed Shariff bin Haji Ibrahim
 1968: Syed Mohamed bin Syed Alwee Alhady
 1968:	Tuanku Mustapha bin Tunku Besar Burhanuddin
 1969:	Keshaminder Singh
 1969:	Nik Hassan bin Haji Nik Abdul Rahman
 1969: Sheikh Hussein bin Sheikh Mohamed
 1969: Tunku Mohamed bin Tunku Besar Burhanuddin

References

External links
 Malaysia: Order of the Royal Household

Loyalty to the Royal Family of Malaysia

Recipients of the Order of Loyalty to the Royal Family of Malaysia
Awards established in 1965
1965 establishments in Malaysia